The Hong Kong Jockey Club (HKJC) is one of the oldest institutions in Hong Kong, having been founded in 1884. In 1960, it was granted a royal charter and renamed The Royal Hong Kong Jockey Club. The institution reverted to its original name in 1996 due to the transfer of sovereignty of Hong Kong in 1997. Membership of the club is by nomination and election.

It is a non-profit organisation providing horse racing, sporting and betting entertainment in Hong Kong. It holds a government-granted monopoly in providing pari-mutuel betting on horse racing, the Mark Six lottery, and fixed odds betting on overseas football events. The organisation is the largest taxpayer in Hong Kong, as well as the largest community benefactor and one of the city's major employers. The Hong Kong Jockey Club Charities Trust donated a record HK$3.6 billion in 2014 to support the different needs of the society and contribute to the betterment of Hong Kong. The club also proactively identifies, funds and develops projects which anticipate and address social issues and pressing needs in Hong Kong. The Hong Kong Jockey Club also provides dining, social, sport and recreation facilities to its approximately 23,000 members. Its Charities Trust is also one of the world's top ten charity donors.

History
Founded in 1884 as an amateur body to promote horse racing, it was an exclusive club whose membership was drawn from the upper class with strict rules of membership, with women and people of unsuitable background being banned. This led to the club having no Chinese members until the 20th century.

The club evolved into a professional institution from 1971. The club organised the annual races which took place around Chinese New Year and was initially financed by commissions on bets which were placed through private clubs.

Queen Elizabeth II accorded the club with a royal charter in 1960, and it became The Royal Hong Kong Jockey Club until 1996.

In July 2005, the decision was made to stage equestrian competitions of the 2008 Summer Olympics in Hong Kong. The club's racing centre at Sha Tin was used as the foundation for the Olympic and Paralympic venues, with additional competition and training venues being incorporated into existing sports facilities at the Hong Kong Sports Institute, the Jockey Club Beas River Country Club and the adjacent golf course.

In January 2023, after Regina Ip proposed increasing taxes on the Jockey Club's football betting revenue, the Jockey Club said that the move would "destroy" its business model and jeopardize public interest. In February 2023, after Financial Secretary Paul Chan increased football betting taxes, Chan said "They can have their reactions, and we will do what we have to do."

Racing activities

The HKJC conducts nearly 700 horse races per year at its two race tracks at Sha Tin (沙田) and Happy Valley (快活谷). During the 2001/02 racing season, the HKJC licensed 1,144 horse owners, 24 trainers and 35 jockeys and had 1,435 horses in training.

In 2002–2003, the betting turnover was HK$71 billion. After paying dividends of 58 billion and betting duty of 9.5 billion, its betting commission revenue was HK$3.9 billion. It contributes 11.7% of Hong Kong's tax revenue. Surpluses from its operation are allocated to The Hong Kong Jockey Club Charities Trust.

Following the transfer of sovereignty of Hong Kong, the popularity of horse racing declined substantially, possibly due to economic conditions in the region.

On 16 March 2007, the HKJC appointed William (Bill) Nader, formerly with the New York Racing Association, as its executive director of racing from April 2007.

On 9 September 2007, Sha Tin Racecourse opened after its summer break with record 1-day crowd of about 60,000. Chief Secretary Henry Tang struck the ceremonial gong. The Hong Kong Jockey Club collected US$106 million in bets (highest since 2001). Children of horse owners were admitted amid protest of local anti-gambling groups. Sunny Power, booted by Howard Cheng, got the trophy in the 1,200-metre dash.

In January 2008, Eclipse and Sovereign Award winning jockey Emma-Jayne Wilson became the first North American female rider to be granted a license to compete in Hong Kong.

The reform and other changes mentioned above, the HKJC revenue has steadily increased back to previous levels and above. The total racing revenue for the Racing Season 2011/2012 reached HK$86.1 billion, up 43.4% since the 2006 reform.

Betting and the law

The HKJC has a legal monopoly over betting on horse racing and football. In 1974, it opened 6 off-course branches where the members of the public could wager on horse race meets at the club's Happy Valley racecourse. There are now in excess of 100 betting branches throughout the territory which accepts bets on racing and football, as well as buy Mark Six lottery tickets.

The HKJC was instrumental in persuading the Hong Kong government to pass the Gambling (Amendment) Bill 2002 to combat unauthorised cross-border gambling and the related promotional activities in Hong Kong, making it a criminal offence for any person in Hong Kong to bet with an unauthorised bookmaker, even when the bets are received outside Hong Kong. The offence applies to all visitors as well as to residents of Hong Kong.

It was also instrumental in persuading other members of the Asian Racing Federation to sign the Good Neighbour policy on 1 September 2003.

2006 Horse racing reforms
In 2006, after years of declining turnover, the Hong Kong Legislative Council passed the Betting Ordinance (Amendment) 2006. This amendment granted the Hong Kong Jockey Club more autonomy in how it ran its own operations.

Single-race bets
Pool Name – Dividend Qualification

 Win – 1st in a race.
 Place – 1st, 2nd or 3rd in a race with 7 or more declared starters or 1st, 2nd in a race with 4, 5, 6 declared starters.
 Quinella – 1st and 2nd in either order in the race.
 Quinella Place (位置Q) – Any two of the first three placed horses in any finishing order in the race.
 Trio (單T) – 1st, 2nd and 3rd in any order in the race.
 Forecast – 1st and 2nd in correct order in the race.
 Tierce – 1st, 2nd and 3rd in correct order in the race.
 First Four – 1st, 2nd, 3rd and 4th in any order in the race. (Merged pool with Quartet)
 Quartet – 1st, 2nd, 3rd and 4th in correct order in the race. (Merged pool with First Four)

As of September 2006, all Win, Place, Quinella, and Quinella Place bets (including All Up bets) of a value of at least 10,000 Hong Kong Dollars are eligible for a 10% rebate if the bet or betline loses.

Multiple-race bets
Pool Name – Dividend Qualification – Consolation [if any]
 Double – 1st in two nominated races – 1st in 1st leg and 2nd in 2nd leg pays a consolation.
 Treble – 1st in three nominated races – 1st in first two legs and 2nd in third leg pays a consolation.
 Double Trio (孖T) – 1st, 2nd and 3rd in any order in both legs.
 Triple Trio (三T) – 1st, 2nd and 3rd in any order in three legs – 1st, 2nd and 3rd in the first two Triple Trio legs but not the final leg pays a consolation.
 Six Up – 1st or 2nd in each of the legs nominated to comprise the Six Up – 1st in each leg pays a bonus.

Fixed-odds bets
 Jockey Challenge – best performing jockey in a race meeting.

Social membership
Membership in this club is very strict, limited to the moneyed social elite. In the past, this club was reserved for only "old money" families; but currently there are increasing numbers of "newly rich" members. Similar to other elite clubs, HKJC membership applicants often must wait for years if not decades to be accepted. What makes it especially difficult to join is that this club does not allow memberships to be bought and sold in the secondary market. As of 2013, the joining membership fee is HK$400,000, with HK$1,800 monthly subscriptions. In addition, every applicant needs the endorsement of two of the only 200 voting members and the support of three other members.

In September 2021, the club terminated several memberships, including those of Martin Lee, Jimmy Lai, and Albert Ho.

Charities
In the 1950s, as Hong Kong struggled with post-war reconstruction and a massive immigration, there was a need for more charitable structures. HKJC enhanced its charitable role in 1955 by formally devoting its annual surplus to charity and community projects. In 1959, the Hong Kong Jockey Club (Charities) Ltd, was formed to administer donations. This company became The Hong Kong Jockey Club Charities Trust in 1993.

The Hong Kong Jockey Club is committed to contributing to the community's long-term sustainability and supporting the different needs of society. In 2014, the club's Charities Trust donated a record HK$3.6 billion to 168 charitable and community projects. The Charities and Community Division proactively identifies and generates projects that anticipate future community and social needs in ten main areas of contributions: Arts, Culture & Heritage; Education & Training; Elderly Services; Emergency & Poverty Relief; Environmental Protection; Family Services; Medical & Health; Rehabilitation Services; Sports & Recreation; and Youth Development. As the club celebrates its 130th Anniversary in 2015, it focuses its efforts to contributing to the community's long-term sustainable needs covering three overarching themes: 1)Helping build Hong Kong into an age-friendly city; 2) Channelling youth energy into social innovation and 3) Supporting sports projects that can create lifelong positive values and hopes.

The Hong Kong Jockey Club supports many social and education institutions. The Jockey Club Government Secondary School in Kowloon Tong and the Jockey Club Ti-I College in Sha Tin was funded by the then Royal Hong Kong Jockey Club. In July 2011, the Hong Kong Jockey Club approved funding of HK$249 million for the Hong Kong Polytechnic University Innovation Tower. The tower was therefore renamed Jockey Club Innovation Tower.

Lease
The Happy Valley Racecourse occupies a 92,000 m^2 plot of land on Inland Lot 8847, under a government-subsidized Private Recreational Lease. The lease began in 1884 and currently is set to expire on 23 June 2034.

Hong Kong Free Press in September 2021 claimed that the Jockey Club has broken its earlier promise to return the land at the Happy Valley Racecourse in exchange for land in Shatin.

Club chairmen

CEO
The role of Chief Executive Officer was first known as the General Manager. Major-General Bernard Penfold was appointed as the club's first General Manager in 1972.

Major-General Robert Bernard Penfold, CB, LVO (1972–1979)
General Sir Arthur John Archer KCB, OBE (1979–1986)
Major-General Guy Hansard Watkins, CB, OBE (1986–1996)
Lawrence Wong Chee-kong (1996–2007)
 Winfried Engelbrecht-Bresges, GBS, JP (2007–present)

See also
 Macau Jockey Club
 Gambling in Hong Kong
 Hong Kong Jockey Club College

References

External links

 
 Satellite view of Shatin race track
 Satellite view of Happy Valley race track

1884 establishments in Hong Kong
Charities based in Hong Kong
Gambling companies of China
Gambling in Hong Kong
Gentlemen's clubs in Hong Kong
Horse racing organizations in China
Horse racing in Hong Kong
Lotteries
Organisations based in Hong Kong with former royal patronage
Sports governing bodies in Hong Kong
Sports organizations established in 1884